To be distinguished from Johann Michael Bach (1745–1820)

Johann Michael Bach (baptised , Arnstadt, Schwarzburg-Sondershausen – , Gehren) was a German composer of the Baroque period.  He was the brother of Johann Christoph Bach, as well as first cousin, once removed and father-in-law of Johann Sebastian Bach (he was the father of J.S. Bach's first wife Maria Barbara Bach). He is sometimes referred to as the "Gehrener Bach" to distinguish him from the "Wuppertaler Bach", Johann Michael Bach (1745–1820).

Life

Johann Michael was born at Arnstadt, the son of Heinrich Bach, who was the great uncle of Johann Sebastian Bach. In 1673, Johann Michael became the organist and town clerk of Gehren, where he lived until his death.

Works

His most-performed work is the small chorale prelude for organ, In Dulci Jubilo, which for many years was attributed to J. S. Bach (it was ascribed the catalog number BWV 751). His other most important works include cantatas Ach, bleib bei uns, Herr Jesu Christ (for choir, strings and continuo), Liebster Jesu, hör mein Flehen (for soprano, alto, two tenors, bass, strings and continuo), and Ach, wie sehnlich wart' ich der Zeit (also for soprano, strings, and continuo).

Das Blut Christi
Ach wie sehnlich wart ich der Zeit
Auf, lasst uns den Herren loben
Halt was du hast
Fürchtet euch nicht
Sei lieber Tag willkommen
Ich weiss, dass mein Erlöser lebt
Herr, ich warte auf dein Heil
Herr, wenn ich dich nur habe
Unser Leben währet siebenzig Jahre

In addition to composing music, J. M. Bach made musical instruments, including harpsichords.

References

External links
 
 Johann Michael Bach at bach-cantatas.com
 Biographie und Werkverzeichnis at classicalarchives.com
 
 

1648 births
1694 deaths
People from Arnstadt
People from Schwarzburg-Sondershausen
Johann Michael
German classical composers
German male composers
German Baroque composers
17th-century classical composers